Jelani Alladin (born August 6, 1992) is an American actor, singer, and dancer. In his Broadway debut, he originated the role of Kristoff in the Frozen musical in 2018.

Early life 
Alladin grew up in the Brownsville neighborhood of Brooklyn in New York City. He attended high school in New Canaan, Connecticut, where he was an athlete and a performer, playing lacrosse and participating in track as well as performing lead roles such as the Emcee in Cabaret and The Cat in the Hat in Seussical.

He then attended the New York University's Tisch School of the Arts, where he studied a variety of acting styles including cinema acting, song and dance acting, and vocal performance.

Career 
Alladin starred in the Off-Broadway show Sweetee as Cat Jones and received the San Francisco Critics Circle Award for Best Leading Actor as Pharus in Choir Boy. Other regional credits include I and You (TheatreSquared), The History Boys (Palmbeach Dramaworks), Violet (Clarence Brown Theatre), and the world premiere of Josephine (Asolo Rep). Alladin has also appeared Off-Broadway at York Theatre in the New York City premiere of Lord Tom and a revival of Don't Bother Me I Can't Cope.

In Alladin's Broadway debut, he played the role of Kristoff in the 2018 musical Frozen. He left Frozen after a year to play the role of Hercules in the musical Hercules.

Filmography

Film

Television

References

External links

Living people
1992 births
People from Brownsville, Brooklyn
American male stage actors